Saint-Christophe (French for Saint Christopher) may refer to:

Places in France

Saint-Christophe, Allier, in the Allier département
Saint-Christophe, Charente, in the Charente département 
Saint-Christophe, Charente-Maritime, in the Charente-Maritime département
Saint-Christophe, Creuse, in the Creuse département 
Saint-Christophe, Eure-et-Loir, in the Eure-et-Loir département
Saint-Christophe, Rhône, in the Rhône département 
Saint-Christophe, Savoie, in the Savoie département 
Saint-Christophe, Tarn, in the Tarn département 
Saint-Christophe, Vienne, in the Vienne département
Saint-Christophe-à-Berry, in the Aisne département
Saint-Christophe-d'Allier, in the Haute-Loire département 
Saint-Christophe-de-Chaulieu, in the Orne département 
Saint-Christophe-de-Double, in the Gironde département 
Saint-Christophe-des-Bardes, in the Gironde département 
Saint-Christophe-des-Bois, in the Ille-et-Vilaine département 
Saint-Christophe-de-Valains, in the Ille-et-Vilaine département
Saint-Christophe-Dodinicourt, in the Aube département 
Saint-Christophe-du-Bois, in the Maine-et-Loire département
Saint-Christophe-du-Foc, in the Manche département 
Saint-Christophe-du-Jambet, in the Sarthe département
Saint-Christophe-du-Ligneron, in the Vendée département 
Saint-Christophe-du-Luat, in the Mayenne département 
Saint-Christophe-en-Bazelle, in the Indre département 
Saint-Christophe-en-Boucherie, in the Indre département
Saint-Christophe-en-Bresse, in the Saône-et-Loire département 
Saint-Christophe-en-Brionnais, in the Saône-et-Loire département
Saint-Christophe-en-Champagne, in the Sarthe département 
Saint-Christophe-en-Oisans, in the Isère département   
Saint-Christophe-et-le-Laris, in the Drôme département 
Saint-Christophe-la-Couperie, in the Maine-et-Loire département 
Saint-Christophe-le-Chaudry, in the Cher département 
Saint-Christophe-le-Jajolet, former commune in the Orne département
Saint-Christophe-sur-Avre, in the Eure département 
Saint-Christophe-sur-Condé, in the Eure département
Saint-Christophe-sur-Dolaison, in the Haute-Loire département 
Saint-Christophe-sur-Guiers, in the Isère département
Saint-Christophe-sur-le-Nais, in the Indre-et-Loire département 
Saint-Christophe-sur-Roc, in the Deux-Sèvres département 
Saint-Christophe-Vallon, in the Aveyron département

 Bourg-Saint-Christophe, in the Ain département
 Bray-Saint-Christophe, in the Aisne département
 Lay-Saint-Christophe, in the Meurthe-et-Moselle département
 Villard-Saint-Christophe, in the Isère département
 Villers-Saint-Christophe, in the Aisne département

Places in Italy

Saint-Christophe, Aosta Valley

Places in Canada

Saint-Christophe-d'Arthabaska

Islands
Saint Kitts island in the West Indies, also known as Saint-Christophe, namely during the French colonial era 1538-1783
Saint Christopher Island (disambiguation), any of several islands
former name of Juan de Nova Island, Indian Ocean

Sports
A.S.D. Vallée d’Aoste Saint-Christophe, football club based in Saint-Christophe, Aosta Valley, Italy